The Luxembourg Sales Lentz League is the name of the professional handball league of Luxembourg.

Competition Format 

The season begins with a tournament between the eights teams. The first six teams qualify for the play-offs, while the last two plays play-downs.

2016/17 Season participants

The following 8 clubs compete in the Sales Lentz League during the 2016–17 season.

National Division Champions
Champions are:

 1937 : HB Eschois Fola
 1938 : HB Eschois Fola (2)
 1940 : HB Eschois Fola (3)
 1942 : HBC Schifflange
 1944 : HB Eschois Fola (4)
 1946 : HB Eschois Fola (5)
 1948 : HC La Fraternelle Esch
 1950 : HB Eschois Fola (6)
 1952 : HB Eschois Fola (7)
 1953 : HB Eschois Fola (8)
 1954 : HB Eschois Fola (9)
 1955 : Red Boys Differdange
 1956 : CA Dudelange
 1957 : CA Dudelange (2)
 1958 : Red Boys Differdange (2)
 1959 : CA Dudelange (3)
 1960 : HB Eschois Fola (10)
 1961 : HB Eschois Fola (11)
 1962 : HB Dudelange
 1963 : HB Eschois Fola (12)
 1964 : HB Dudelange (2)

 1965 : HB Dudelange (3)
 1966 : HB Dudelange (4)
 1967 : HB Dudelange (5)
 1968 : HB Dudelange (6)
 1969 : HB Dudelange (7)
 1970 : HB Dudelange (8)
 1971 : HB Dudelange (9)
 1972 : HB Dudelange (10)
 1973 : HB Dudelange (11)
 1974 : HB Eschois Fola (13)
 1975 : HB Eschois Fola (14)
 1976 : HB Dudelange (12)
 1977 : HB Dudelange (13)
 1978 : HB Eschois Fola (15)
 1979 : HB Eschois Fola (16)
 1980 : HB Dudelange (14)
 1981 : HB Dudelange (15)
 1982 : HBC Schifflange (2)
 1983 : HB Eschois Fola (17)
 1984 : HB Dudelange (16)
 1985 : HB Dudelange (17)

 1986 : HB Dudelange (18)
 1987 : HB Eschois Fola (18)
 1988 : HB Eschois Fola (19)
 1989 : HB Eschois Fola (20)
 1990 : Red Boys Differdange (3)
 1991 : Red Boys Differdange (4)
 1992 : HB Dudelange (19)
 1993 : CHEV Handball Diekirch
 1994 : HB Echternach
 1995 : HC Berchem
 1996 : HC La Fraternelle Esch (2)
 1997 : Red Boys Differdange (5)
 1998 : Red Boys Differdange (6)
 1999 : Red Boys Differdange (7)
 2000 : HC Berchem (2)
 2001 : HC Berchem (3)
 2002 : HB Esch
 2003 : HB Esch (2)
 2004 : HB Esch (3)
 2005 : HC Berchem (4)
 2006 : HC Berchem (5)

 2007 : HB Esch (4)
 2008 : HB Dudelange (20)
 2009 : HB Dudelange (21)
 2010 : HB Esch (5)
 2011 : HC Berchem (6) 
 2012 : HB Dudelange (22)
 2013 : HB Esch (6)
 2014 : Handball Käerjeng
 2015 : HB Dudelange (23)
 2016 : Red Boys Differdange (8)
 2017 : HB Esch (7)
 2018 : Handball Käerjeng (2)
 2019 : HB Esch (8)
 2020 : HB Esch (9)

EHF coefficient ranking
For season 2017/2018, see footnote

28.  (34)  Meistriiliga (6.83)
29.  (29)  Superliga (6.67)
30.  (21)  Sales Lentz League (6.00)
30.  (25)  Ligat Winner (6.00)
32.  (28)  Premijer liga BiH (5.56)

External links
 www.flh.lu

References

Handball leagues in Luxembourg
Sales Lentz League
Luxembourg